Omorgus eyrensis is a species of hide beetle in the subfamily Omorginae.

References

eyrensis
Beetles described in 1904